István Bank (born 14 April 1984, in Kaposvár) is a Hungarian football player who currently plays for Kaposvári Rákóczi FC.

External links 
www.hlsz.hu 

1984 births
Living people
People from Kaposvár
Hungarian footballers
Association football midfielders
Kaposvári Rákóczi FC players
Győri ETO FC players
Nemzeti Bajnokság I players
Sportspeople from Somogy County